Thomas M. Madden (March 28, 1907 – March 29, 1976) was a United States district judge of the United States District Court for the District of New Jersey.

Education and career

Born in Philadelphia, Pennsylvania, Madden received a Bachelor of Laws from Rutgers Law School in 1930. He then entered private practice in Camden, New Jersey, where he was also the municipal solicitor for Bellmawr, Clementon and Voorhees Township, New Jersey. He was an Assistant United States Attorney of the District of New Jersey from 1943 to 1945.

Federal judicial service

On October 9, 1945, Madden was nominated by President Harry S. Truman to a seat on the United States District Court for the District of New Jersey vacated by Judge John Boyd Avis. Madden was confirmed by the United States Senate on October 23, 1945, and received his commission on October 25, 1945. He served as Chief Judge from 1961 to 1968 and as a member of the Judicial Conference of the United States from 1961 to 1966, assuming senior status due to a certified disability on January 1, 1968. Madden served in that capacity until his death on March 29, 1976, at his home in Collingswood, New Jersey.

References

Sources
 

1907 births
1976 deaths
Rutgers School of Law–Camden alumni
Judges of the United States District Court for the District of New Jersey
People from Collingswood, New Jersey
Lawyers from Philadelphia
United States district court judges appointed by Harry S. Truman
20th-century American judges
Assistant United States Attorneys